Taft Information Technology High School is a public high school located in the West End area of downtown Cincinnati, Ohio. It is part of the Cincinnati Public Schools district (CPS).

History
The school was created in 1955 and named after former U.S. Senator Robert A. Taft, the son of former United States President William H. Taft. In the spring of 2011, a new $18 million building was constructed.

Academics
Taft is a GRAD Cincinnati school, which helps students focus on the goal of going to college. This program awards college scholarships to students who fulfill requirements.

Athletics

Stargel Stadium
Taft Stadium was completed in 1986 for the school's football program, replacing a makeshift, hole-ridden practice field. In 1990, it was renamed for Willard R. Stargel, who served as football assistant coach and baseball and track head coach from 1955 to 1966. Stargel Stadium was rebuilt in 2004 and renovated in 2015. Taft shared the stadium with several other CPS athletic teams, namely the football teams of Aiken, Hughes, Shroder, Gamble, and Riverview East high schools and the track teams of Gamble, Riverview East, and Sayler Park School. The stadium was also home to Cincinnati Christian University football, Gotham Soccer, Kings Hammer Soccer, and Cincinnati Gators football. Stargel Stadium was demolished in 2018 to make room for FC Cincinnati's TQL Stadium.

Cincinnati Public Schools built a new Willard Stargel Stadium across the street from Taft in 2019. FC Cincinnati paid the district $ for the relocation. The 2019 football season opening game was held at the new stadium on August 28 before the official dedication on September 13. The stadium has a capacity of 3,000.

Ohio High School Athletic Association State Championships
 Basketball – 1962, 2011,  2022

Notable alumni
 Adolphus Washington, NFL player (Buffalo Bills, 2016–18)
 Jimmy Wynn, former MLB player (Houston Astros, Los Angeles Dodgers, Atlanta Braves, New York Yankees, Milwaukee Brewers)

References

External links
 

Cincinnati Public Schools
High schools in Hamilton County, Ohio
Public high schools in Ohio